Nataliya Viktorovna Stasyuk (born 21 January 1969 in Vostochnoy) is a retired Belarusian rower who won a bronze medal at the 1996 Summer Olympics, as well as two medals at the world championships in 1991 and 1995. On 16 July 2000 she was banned for life from competitions for a positive doping test.

References 

1969 births
Living people
Belarusian female rowers
Rowers at the 1992 Summer Olympics
Rowers at the 1996 Summer Olympics
Olympic bronze medalists for Belarus
Olympic rowers of Belarus
Olympic rowers of the Unified Team
Olympic medalists in rowing
Medalists at the 1996 Summer Olympics
World Rowing Championships medalists for Belarus
World Rowing Championships medalists for the Soviet Union
People from Gomel